G. Norman Anderson (born March 26, 1932) is an American diplomat and author, serving as the United States ambassador to Sudan from 1986 to 1989.

Early life and education
Anderson was born in Lewes, Delaware. He graduated from Columbia College in 1954 with a Bachelor of Arts. He completed a master's degree at the School of International and Public Affairs, Columbia University in 1960. At Columbia, he studied Russian and Soviet affairs at the Harriman Institute.

Career
Anderson served in the United States Navy as a lieutenant from 1954 to 1958. He then joined the Foreign Service as a personnel officer from 1960 to 1962. His first assignment was as political officer in Beirut from 1963 - 1966. He was assigned to Moscow, first as assistant administrative officer from 1967 to 1968, and then political officer from 1968 - 1969. Mr. Anderson returned to the US in 1969 to become the Soviet desk officer until 1971, when he was assigned as Egyptian desk officer. He left the US in 1974 to serve as the political counselor in Rabat, Morocco until 1978.

He was named special assistant to the senior adviser to the President and Secretary of State on Middle East and Soviet Affairs. From 1979 to 1982, he served as deputy chief of mission in Sofia, Bulgaria. From 1982 to 1986, he was the deputy chief of mission in Tunisia.

In 1986, Anderson was appointed United States Ambassador to the Republic of Sudan, and held this post until 1989. He was involved in the famine relief efforts during that time.  He remained in the post until 1989.

Personal life
Anderson is married to the former Mary (Bonnie) McIlvaine, has three children, and resides in the Washington D.C. area. Anderson speaks English, Arabic, French, Russian, Spanish, Ukrainian, Bulgarian, and Swedish.

Bibliography
Anderson is the author of Sudan in Crisis:The Failure of Democracy. The book was reviewed in Foreign Affairs, Christian Science Monitor, Arab Studies Quarterly, and the International Journal of African Historical Studies.

References 

1932 births
American non-fiction writers
People from Lewes, Delaware
Living people
Columbia College (New York) alumni
School of International and Public Affairs, Columbia University alumni
United States Foreign Service personnel
American expatriates in Lebanon
American expatriates in the Soviet Union
American expatriates in Morocco
American expatriates in Bulgaria
American expatriates in Tunisia
American expatriates in Sudan
United States Navy officers
Ambassadors of the United States to Sudan